Kim Sung-heon (born 2 September 1974) is a Korean handball player who competed in the 2004 Summer Olympics.

References

1974 births
Living people
South Korean male handball players
Olympic handball players of South Korea
Handball players at the 2004 Summer Olympics
Asian Games medalists in handball
Handball players at the 1998 Asian Games
Asian Games gold medalists for South Korea
Sungkyunkwan University alumni
Medalists at the 1998 Asian Games
BM Granollers players